France Bloch-Sérazin ((21 February 1913 – 12 February 1943) was a chemist and militant communist who fought in the French resistance against German occupation during World War II.

Biography 

Born in Paris into a Jewish family, she was the daughter of the writer Jean-Richard Bloch (1884-1947) and Marguerite Herzog (1886-1975) who was sister of the writer André Maurois. France Bloch was initially a student in the countryside near Poitiers, France, where she obtained a degree in chemistry after having hesitated between chemistry, literature and philosophy. In October 1934, she began working at the laboratory of Professor Urbain at the National Institute of Chemistry. She joined the Communist Party in Paris, becoming involved in the support of the Spanish Republicans who were fighting fascism there.

Bloch married Frédéric Sérazin, nicknamed Frédo, in May 1939. He was a militant communist and metallurgist, with whom she had a son named Roland, born in January 1940.

After the installation of the Vichy regime, Bloch was barred from her laboratory because she was a Jewish communist and had to work as a tutor in order to survive. In 1941, she participated in the first groups of the communist resistance led by Raymond Losserand and installed a small, rudimentary laboratory in her two-room apartment on the Place du Danube located in the 19th arrondissement in Paris. Taking the name Claudia in hiding, she worked with Colonel Dumont making grenades and detonators used in attacks organized by the youth resistance (called the Young Battalions) at the end of August 1941.

Bloch was arrested by the French police on 16 May 1942. After four months of interrogation and torture, she was condemned to death by a German military tribunal, along with 18 co-conspirators (who were all immediately executed). Meanwhile, Bloch herself was deported to Germany and imprisoned in a fortress at Lübeck. She was subjected to further torture there, and was decapitated by guillotine in Hamburg on 12 February 1943.

In her last letter to her husband before her execution,  Bloch-Sérazin wrote: "I die for what we fought for, I fought; you know like me that I could not have acted other than I acted: we cannot change.”  Her husband would be executed in 1944.

On the site of the Hamburg prison, a plaque on the back wall of the detention center commemorates two members of the Resistance who were killed there. A translation of the inscription reads:France Bloch-Sérazin, 21 February 1913 -- 12 February 194

Suzanne Masson, 10 July 1901 - 1 November 1943

These two French women were beheaded with a guillotine in this prison because of their resistance to National Socialist tyranny in occupied France.

Bloch family 
Bloch's husband, Frédo Sérazin was arrested in February 1940, under the Daladier government, imprisoned first at the Sisteron fortress in March 1940, then at Châteaubriant, and finally at the Voves camp. He was assassinated by the German militia or the Gestapo in 1944 in Saint-Etienne, France.

Although Bloch's parents survived the Holocaust, her paternal grandmother, Louise Laure Marie Lévy Bloch (born Carling, near the France-German border on 15 June 1858), was almost 86 when she was arrested on 12 May 1944 by the Gestapo in a roundup in Néris-les-Bains. Louise Bloch was interned in Vichy. She was transferred on 26 May 1944 to the camp near Drancy and received registration number 23255. Despite her advanced age, she was reportedly a model of energy, confidence and strength. On 30 May 1944, she was deported to Auschwitz in convoy number 75. She died there 5 days later, on 4 June 1944. A plaque listing the deportees can be found at the Monument to the Dead in Néris-les-Bains, France; it bears her name.

Honors 
Posthumously, France Bloch-Sérazin was awarded the Legion of Honor, the Resistance Medal, and the War Cross.

A street was named after her in Blanc-Mesnil, Poitiers, Vierzon, as well as a square in Cognac.

References

External links 
 (In French) Dernière lettre de France Bloch-Sérazin de la prison de Hambourg où elle a été guillotinée. La lettre a été expédiée grâce à la gardienne de la prison. (In English: Last letter by France Bloch-Sérazin from prison.)
 (In German) "Die französische Widerstandskämpferin France Bloch-Sérazin" ("France Bloch-Sérazin, membre de la Résistance")
 (In German) Plaque commémorative à Paris et film de Loretta Walz. (In English: Commemorative plaque in Paris and film by Loretta Walz.) 
(In French) Jean Omnes, Nicole Racine, article "France Bloch" in Dictionnaire biographique du mouvement ouvrier, Editions ouvrières, 1997.
(In French) https://www.humanite.fr/portrait-france-bloch-un-amour-sur-fond-de-resistance-657001
(in French)  Group Operations: https://www.resistance-ftpf.net/chimie/operations.html

1913 births
1943 deaths
20th-century French Jews
French women activists
French communists
Politicians from Paris
French people executed by Nazi Germany
French people executed abroad
People executed by Nazi Germany by guillotine
Executed French women
Communist members of the French Resistance
Jews in the French resistance
Female resistance members of World War II
20th-century French women
Resistance members killed by Nazi Germany